A girl group is a popular music act featuring several female singers who generally harmonize together. Girl groups have been popular at least since the heyday of the Boswell Sisters beginning in the 1930s, but the term "girl group" also denotes the wave of American female pop singing groups who flourished in the late 1950s and early 1960s between the decline of early rock and roll and the British Invasion, many of whom were influenced by doo-wop style. This article covers only girl groups from that era and later.

Sales figures records in most countries are not available before the 1990s, so it is difficult to accurately determine best-selling records, either by country or worldwide. Certification levels have been used for most countries, but certification was not common until the 1970s in the US and UK, and later in other countries. In addition, in many countries certification is for shipments of a record to retailers, rather than actual sales. Complicating matters further, the changes from 2010 onwards as certifications have become based on combined sales figures and streaming instead of sales alone.

As a result, these tables should not be considered finalized of the best-selling records by girl groups in each country.

Best-selling girl groups worldwide

Groups with claimed total record sales of more than 20 million:

Best-selling girl group singles

Worldwide 
It is extremely difficult to assess worldwide sales of singles, due to the lack of auditing in many countries, and that no country officially tracked sales before the 1990s. In the second edition of The Book of Golden Discs, author Joseph Murrell calculated a worldwide sales figure of 18 million singles for Baccara's "Yes Sir, I Can Boogie", but this figure is disputed and has never been officially confirmed. Other claimed worldwide sales figures for singles by girl groups are shown in the table below:

Notes:

Australia 
Singles certified platinum or more by the Australian Recording Industry Association (ARIA). Only includes certifications since 1989, when ARIA took over compiling the Australian charts. From November 2014 onwards paid-for audio streams were included in the Australian singles chart and counted towards sales and certifications.

Certifications based on sales only

Certifications based on sales + on-demand digital streaming

France
Singles certified diamond (750,000 sales) based on sales only

Singles certified gold (250,000 sales) based on sales only

Certifications based on sales + on-demand digital streaming

Germany
Certifications based on sales only

Certifications based on sales + on-demand digital streaming

Note: Certification levels in Germany have changed several times over the years – the certification level for a gold single was 250,000 until the end of 2002, 150,000 between 2003 and mid-2014, and 200,000 from mid-2014 onwards. These different levels are reflected in the table above.
From January 2014 onwards, paid-for audio streams were included in the German singles chart and counted towards sales and certifications.

Japan 
The ten biggest-selling girl group singles in Japan based on total sales (May 2020):

From January 2014, RIAJ changed calculation method for Detailed Sales and the Gold Record.

New Zealand
Singles certified platinum or more by Recorded Music NZ. Since November 2014 certifications for singles have included streaming, and therefore cannot be compared to certifications from before this date.

Certifications based on sales only

Certifications based on sales + on-demand digital streaming

South Korea 
The Circle Digital Chart, a component of the Circle Chart, released download sales from its launch in 2010 until 2017, and began a certification scheme in 2018. Prior to the establishment of the Circle Music Chart, the country's music charts were supplied by the Music Industry Association of Korea (MIAK), which did not track digital single downloads.

Prior to certification (2010–2017) 
South Korea experienced a decline in digital music sales volume which began in late 2012. The price of digital downloads was greatly inflated, and as a result, no girl group songs released since 2013 have surpassed the three million sales mark.

After certification (2018–present) 
The Circle Chart stopped releasing download sales in December 2017. However, the chart began implementing record certifications in April 2018, at a level of 2,500,000 sales per Platinum level. Every song released since 1 January 2018 is eligible for a certification.

Sweden 
There were few certifications awarded in Sweden before 1996, so singles before this date are not represented in this list. There have been three different certification levels since 1996: from 1996 to June 2003 the gold/platinum levels for singles were 15,000/30,000, from July 2003 to September 2010 the levels were 10,000/20,000, and from October 2010 onwards, when streaming was included in the certification levels, the levels have been 20,000/40,000. The tables below reflect these changes in certification levels.

Certifications based on sales only

Certifications based on sales + on-demand digital streaming

Switzerland

United Kingdom 
Since July 2014, certifications have included audio streams so they cannot be compared to sales-only certifications before this date. The ten biggest-selling girl group singles in the United Kingdom:

Physical and digital sales only (before July 2014)

Physical and digital sales + on-demand digital streaming (after July 2014)

United States 

Sales figures of records in the US were not tracked accurately until May 1991, when Nielsen SoundScan started recording sales of singles and albums electronically at point of sale, rather than relying on figures provided to them by record store staff. As a result, there are no reliable sales figures available before this date, and therefore it is not possible to rank the best-selling singles by girl groups in the US in sales order.

Since 2013 certifications have included legal on-demand digital streams – separate figures for the pure sales component of singles released after 2013 are not available so they cannot be compared to sales-only certifications before this date.

Certifications based on sales only

RIAA sales certifications began in the US in 1958 – there are very few records with certifications before this date. Until 1988 a million-seller received a gold certification (and a two million-seller received a platinum certification). From 1989 onwards the levels were revised so that a million-seller received a platinum certification instead, with multi-platinum awards for multiple million sales. However, these pre- and post-1989 certification levels are not currently reflected in the RIAA database.

The following singles have been certified by RIAA as selling one million copies or more in the US.

In addition, the following singles have been stated as selling one million copies or more in the US – however, they have not been certified by the RIAA.

Certifications based on sales + on-demand digital streaming

Best-selling girl group albums

Worldwide

Australia 
Albums certified platinum or more by ARIA. Only includes certifications since 1990.

Brazil 
Based on certifications awarded by Pro-Música Brasil. Certifications have only been awarded since 1990, so there is no sales information before this date. Some of the certification thresholds have changed over time.

Canada 
Certifications according to Music Canada.

Europe 
Albums certified platinum or more for more than one million sales in Europe, according to the International Federation of the Phonographic Industry.

Note: the IFPI Europe Platinum Award was only created in 1996, therefore there are few albums on this list from before that date. No awards are publicly available after 2014.

France
Certifications according to SNEP.

Germany 
Certifications according to the BVMI.

Japan 
Sales according to Oricon and Platinum certifications according to the RIAJ. The ten biggest-selling girl group albums in Japan:

Netherlands 
Certifications according to the NVPI.

New Zealand

South Korea 
Sales of albums released after 2010 are according to the Circle Album Chart published monthly and yearly with detailed album sales by the Korea Music Content Association (KMCA). Sales of albums released before 2010 are based on data collected by Music Industry Association of Korea (from 1999 to 2007) or claimed sales based on reliable sources. The ten biggest-selling girl group albums in South Korea:

Switzerland 
Certifications according to the IFPI.

Taiwan

United Kingdom 
Albums certified triple platinum or more by the BPI.

United States 
Albums certified platinum or more by the RIAA. The sales figures shown for the quadruple and triple platinum albums are sales recorded by Nielsen SoundScan plus known sales from BMG's Music Club. These do not represent the total sales of the album in the US as they exclude unknown sales figures from Columbia House and other music clubs.

See also 
 List of best-selling boy bands
 List of best-selling music artists
 List of best-selling singles
 List of best-selling albums
 List of girl groups

Notes

References 

Girl groups

Lists of musicians
Lists of women in music